Elaphrus is a genus of ground beetle native to the Palearctic, the Nearctic, the Near East and Northern Africa. It contains the following species:

 Elaphrus americanus Dejean, 1831 
 Elaphrus angulonotus Shi & Liang, 2008 
 Elaphrus angusticollis R. F. Sahlberg, 1844 
 Elaphrus aureus P.W.J. Muller, 1821
 Elaphrus californicus Mannerheim, 1843 
 Elaphrus cicatricosus Leconte, 1848 
 Elaphrus citharus Goulet And Smetana, 1997
 Elaphrus clairvillei Kirby, 1837 
 Elaphrus comatus Goulet, 1983
 Elaphrus cupreus Duftschmid, 1812
 Elaphrus finitimus Casey, 1920 
 Elaphrus fuliginosus Say, 1830 
 Elaphrus hypocrita Semenov, 1926
 Elaphrus japonicus Ueno, 1954
 Elaphrus laevigatus Leconte, 1852 
 Elaphrus lapponicus Gyllenhal, 1810
 Elaphrus lecontei Crotch, 1876 
 Elaphrus lheritieri Antoine, 1947
 Elaphrus lindrothi Goulet, 1983 
 Elaphrus marginicollis Goulet, 1983 
 Elaphrus mimus Goulet, 1983 
 Elaphrus olivaceus Leconte, 1863 
 Elaphrus parviceps Van Dyke, 1925 
 Elaphrus potanini Semenov, 1889
 Elaphrus punctatus Motschulsky, 1844
 Elaphrus purpurans Hausen, 1891 
 Elaphrus pyrenoeus Motschulsky, 1850
 Elaphrus riparius (Linnaeus, 1758) 
 Elaphrus ruscarius Say, 1834 
 Elaphrus sibiricus Motschulsky, 1844
 Elaphrus smaragdiceps Semenov, 1889
 Elaphrus splendidus Fischer Von Waldheim, 1828
 Elaphrus sugai Nakane, 1987
 Elaphrus tibetanus Semenov, 1904
 Elaphrus trossulus Semenov, 1904
 Elaphrus tuberculatus Maklin, 1878
 Elaphrus uliginosus Fabricius, 1792
 Elaphrus ullrichii W. Redtenbacher, 1842 
 Elaphrus viridis Horn, 1878 
 Elaphrus weissi Dostal, 1996

References

External links
Elaphrus at Fauna Europaea

Elaphrinae